Bury St Edmunds Eastgate railway station (also known as Bury Eastgate  was a station in the town of Bury St Edmunds, England, on the Long Melford-Bury St Edmunds Branch. It was opened in 1865 and closed in 1909.

The station was demolished after closure and following closure of the line in 1965 the route was occupied by the A14 road. Today the town's rail traffic is handled entirely by Bury St Edmunds railway station.

References

Disused railway stations in Suffolk
Former Great Eastern Railway stations
Railway stations in Great Britain opened in 1865
Railway stations in Great Britain closed in 1909
1865 establishments in England
1909 disestablishments in England